The second season of The Fugitive originally aired Tuesdays at 10:00-11:00 pm on ABC from September 15, 1964 to April 20, 1965. The season was released through two volumes on Region 1 DVDs, with the first volume (containing the first 15 episodes) being released on June 10, 2008 and Volume 2 being released on March 31, 2009.

Episodes

References

The Fugitive (TV series) seasons